Ralph Gilbert & Son was a light car manufacturer based in Birmingham, England in 1901.

The light cars were fitted with Gilbert's own single cylinder two stroke horizontal 3.5 hp engine with chain drive to the rear wheels.

See also
 List of car manufacturers of the United Kingdom

References

Defunct motor vehicle manufacturers of England
Defunct companies based in Birmingham, West Midlands
Manufacturing companies based in Birmingham, West Midlands
Veteran vehicles
Vehicles introduced in 1901